Defending champions Robin Ammerlaan and Ronald Vink defeated Stéphane Houdet and Nicolas Peifer in the final, 6–7(8–10), 6–1, 6–3 to win the gentlemen's doubles wheelchair tennis title at the 2008 Wimbledon Championships.

Seeds

  Robin Ammerlaan /  Ronald Vink (champions)
  Stéphane Houdet /  Nicolas Peifer (final)

Draw

Finals

References

External links
Draw

Men's Wheelchair Doubles
Wimbledon Championship by year – Wheelchair men's doubles